Olympique Marrakech or Chez Ali Club de Marrakech previously, is a Moroccan football club based in Marrakech.
The club was founded in 2001. In 2007 the team was promoted to the GNF 2.

References

Football clubs in Morocco
Association football clubs established in 2001
Sport in Marrakesh
2001 establishments in Morocco
Sports clubs in Morocco